The 1927 Duquesne Dukes football team represented Duquesne University during the 1927 college football season. The head coach was Elmer Layden, coaching his first season with the Dukes.

Schedule

References

Duquesne
Duquesne Dukes football seasons
Duquesne Dukes football